Mário Silva may refer to:

Mário Silva (footballer) (born 1977), Portuguese footballer
Mário Silva (athlete) (born 1961), Portuguese middle-distance runner
Mário Silva (cyclist) (born 1940), Portuguese Olympic cyclist
Mario Silva (politician) (born 1966), Canadian politician
Mario De Silva (born 1935), Italian Olympic wrestler
Mario Silva, host of La Hojilla, an opinion program that airs on Venezolana de Televisión